The 1965–66 season was Aberdeen's 53rd season in the top flight of Scottish football and their 55th season overall. Aberdeen competed in the Scottish League Division One, Scottish League Cup and Scottish Cup.

Results
Own goals in italics

Division 1

Final standings

Scottish League Cup

Group 2

Group 2 final table

Scottish Cup

References

 
 AFC Heritage Trust

Aberdeen F.C. seasons
Aber